John Lurie (born December 14, 1952) is an American musician, painter, actor, director, and producer. He co-founded the Lounge Lizards jazz ensemble; has acted in 19 films, including Stranger than Paradise and Down by Law; has composed and performed music for 20 television and film works; and he produced, directed, and starred in the Fishing with John television series. In 1996 his soundtrack for Get Shorty was nominated for a Grammy Award, and his album The Legendary Marvin Pontiac: Greatest Hits has been praised by critics and fellow musicians.

Since 2000, he has suffered from symptoms attributed to chronic Lyme disease and has focused his attention on painting. His art has been shown in galleries and museums around the world. His primitivist painting Bear Surprise became an internet meme in Russia in 2006. His new television series, Painting with John, debuted on HBO in January 2021. It received 100% on Rotten Tomatoes. " Robert Lloyd of Los Angeles Times wrote, "Painting With John represents HBO at its most worthwhile.". Lurie's 1980s NYC memoir, The History of Bones, was published by Penguin Random House in August 2021.

Early life
Lurie was born in Minneapolis and raised with his brother Evan and sister Liz in New Orleans, Louisiana and Worcester, Massachusetts.

In high school, he played basketball and harmonica and jammed with Mississippi Fred McDowell and Canned Heat in 1968. He briefly played the harmonica in a band from Boston, but soon switched to the guitar and eventually the saxophone.

After high school, he hitchhiked across the United States to Berkeley, California. He moved to New York City in 1974, then briefly visited London, where he performed his first saxophone solo at the Acme Gallery.

Music

The Lounge Lizards

In 1978 John formed the Lounge Lizards with his brother Evan Lurie on piano; they were the only constant members in the band through numerous lineup changes.

Robert Palmer of The New York Times described the band as "staking out new territory west of Mingus, east of Bernard Herrman." While originally a somewhat satirical "fake jazz" combo spawned by the noisy No Wave music scene, the Lounge Lizards gradually became a showcase for Lurie's increasingly sophisticated compositions. The band had five to eight members. Musicians included, at different times, guitarists Arto Lindsay, Marc Ribot, David Tronzo, Michele Navazio and Danny Blumenthal; cellist Jane Scarpantoni; vibraphonist Bryan Carrott; keyboardist John Medeski; drummers Anton Fier, Grant Calvin Weston and Dougie Bowne; percussionists Billy Martin, E.J. Rodriguez and Ben Perowsky; bassists Erik Sanko, Tony Scherr, Oren Bloedow and Tony Garnier; trumpeter Steven Bernstein; trombonist Curtis Fowlkes and saxophonists Roy Nathanson and Michael Blake. They made music for 20 years.

Marvin Pontiac
In 1999 Lurie released the album The Legendary Marvin Pontiac: Greatest Hits, a posthumous collection of the work of an African-Jewish musician named Marvin Pontiac, a fictional character Lurie created. It includes a biographical profile describing the troubled genius's hard life, and the cover shows a photograph purported to be one of the few ever taken of him.  Lurie wrote the music and performed with John Medeski, Billy Martin, G. Calvin Weston, Marc Ribot, and Tony Scherr. The album received praise from David Bowie, Angelique Kidjo, Iggy Pop, Leonard Cohen and others. On choosing to create a character to whom the album would be fictionally credited, Lurie said in a 2008 interview, "For a long time, I was threatening to do a vocal record. But the idea of me putting out a record where I sang seemed ostentatious or pretentious. Like the music of Telly Savalas . . . I don't sing very well, I was shy about it. As a character, it made it easier."

In 2017, John Lurie released his first music album in 17 years, Marvin Pontiac: The Asylum Tapes.

John Lurie National Orchestra

Parallel to the final version of the Lounge Lizards in the early 1990s, Lurie formed a smaller group, the John Lurie National Orchestra. Lurie played alto and soprano saxes, Grant Calvin Weston played drums, and Billy Martin performed on congas, timbales, kalimba, and other small percussion. Unlike the tightly-arranged music of the Lounge Lizards, the Orchestra's music was heavily improvised and compositions were credited to all three musicians.

They released the album Men With Sticks (Crammed Discs 1993) and recorded music for the Fishing With John TV series. In February 2014 the Orchestra released The Invention of Animals, a collection of out-of-print studio tracks and unreleased live recordings from the '90s. Columnist Mel Minter wrote:

This new release may require a reassessment of Lurie the saxophonist because the playing is engagingly fluid, inventive, and visceral—and well worth revisiting. . . . The emotional immediacy of Lurie's playing – and that of his partners – makes for riveting stuff. Think of his sax not so much as a musical instrument, but instead, as a window with a clear view of his soul.

Jeff Jackson of Jazziz added, "The resulting music is delicate, primal and utterly gorgeous."

Film and television
In 1993 Lurie composed the theme to Late Night with Conan O'Brien with Howard Shore. The theme was also used when O'Brien hosted on The Tonight Show. Lurie formed his own record label in 1998, Strange & Beautiful Music, and released the Lounge Lizards album Queen of All Ears and a Fishing with John soundtrack.

Lurie has written scores for over 20 movies, including Stranger than Paradise, Down by Law, Mystery Train, Clay Pigeons, Animal Factory, and Get Shorty, for which he received a Grammy Award nomination.

In the 1980s, Lurie starred in the Jim Jarmusch films Stranger Than Paradise and Down by Law, and made cameos in the films Permanent Vacation and Downtown 81. He went on to act in other notable films including Paris, Texas and The Last Temptation of Christ. From 2001 to 2003 he starred in the HBO prison series Oz as inmate Greg Penders.

Lurie wrote, directed and starred in the TV series Fishing with John in 1991 and 1992, which featured guests Tom Waits, Willem Dafoe, Matt Dillon, Jim Jarmusch, and Dennis Hopper. It aired on IFC and Bravo. It has since become a cult classic and was released on DVD by Criterion.

In January 2021 Lurie's series Painting with John aired on HBO. In June 2021 he announced that a second season of the show was planned and for the first time in 22 years, he was rehearsing music for it.

Painting

Lurie has been painting since the 1970s. Most of his early works are in watercolor and pencil, but in the 2000s he began working in oil. In 2011, he said of his art, "My paintings are a logical development from the ones that were taped to the refrigerator 50 years ago."

His work has been exhibited since July 2003, when two pieces were shown at the Nolan/Eckman Gallery in New York City. He had his first solo gallery exhibition at Anton Kern Gallery in May and June 2004 and has subsequently been exhibited at Galerie Daniel Blau in Munich, Galerie Lelong in Zürich, the Galerie Gabriel Rolt in Amsterdam, the Basel International Art Fair at Roebling Hall and the P.S.1 Contemporary Art Center in New York, the Montreal Museum of Fine Arts, the NEXT Art Fair in Chicago, the Mudam Luxembourg, the Watari Museum of Contemporary Art in Tokyo, Gallery Brown in Los Angeles, and the University of the Arts in Philadelphia. The Museum of Modern Art has acquired some of his work for their permanent collection.

Lurie has released two art books. Learn To Draw, a compilation of black and white drawings, was published by Walther Konig in June 2006. A Fine Example of Art includes over 80 reproductions of his work and was published by powerHouse Books in 2008.

Lurie's watercolor painting Bear Surprise was enormously popular on numerous Russian websites in an Internet meme known as Preved.

Personal life

Romantic relationships
Lurie has never married. He detailed many of his romantic relationships between the 1970s and 1990s in his 2021 memoir The History of Bones. In August 2010, Lurie was reported to be dating a woman named Jill Goodwin (born c. 1979).

Health
Lurie became ill with neurological symptoms in 1994, and has experienced debilitating ill health since 2000. At one point he was told he had a year to live. During this time, he wrote in a mad dash until his brain fog got so severe that he had to stop writing.

He stated in a 2006 interview that he has "Advanced Lyme"—referring to chronic Lyme disease—a controversial diagnosis generally rejected by medical professionals to describe "a broad array of illnesses or symptom complexes for which there is no reproducible or convincing scientific evidence of any relationship to Borrelia burgdorferi infection." He has stated that his diagnosis was received from "eight different purveyors of contemporary medicine" after years of disagreement among his physicians. Lurie's illness prevents him from acting or performing music, so he spends his time painting.

Stalking incident
In August 2010, Tad Friend wrote a piece in The New Yorker about Lurie disappearing from New York to avoid a man named John Perry, who Friend said was stalking Lurie. In the online literary magazine The Rumpus, Rick Moody noted that Friend's profile in The New Yorker, nominally about Lurie and his art, was two-thirds to three-quarters about Perry, including a full page photo of Perry standing in front of one of his own paintings. Moody described Perry as a deceitful stalker capable of violence and was also critical of Friend's "ungenerous" characterization of Lurie's illness as a "mysterious disease."

In May 2011 Perry undertook a public hunger strike to protest The New Yorker characterizing him as a stalker. Commenting about the protest, Lurie said, "He's conducting a hunger strike a half block from my house to prove he's not a stalker." Lurie described the article as "wildly inaccurate," noting that its publication did not resolve anything and that "the situation continues."

Editor David Remnick said the piece in his magazine was "thoroughly reported and fact-checked." But in a letter to The New Yorker in August 2012, several interviewees claimed their words had been "twisted, misquoted, or ignored," and that "the man presented in the article [Lurie] is not the man that we know." In a February 2014 interview, Lurie told the Los Angeles Times, "What one would hope is that the beauty in the music and in the paintings can somehow transcend and invalidate the kind of sickness that led to the article being written as it was and the kind of irresponsibility that allowed it to be published."

Filmography

Discography

John Lurie 
 John Lurie National Orchestra, The Invention of Animals, 2014
 John Lurie National Orchestra: Men with Sticks (Crammed Discs/Made to Measure, 1993)
 The Legendary Marvin Pontiac: Greatest Hits (Strange and Beautiful Music, 1999)
 Marvin Pontiac: The Asylum Tapes (Strange and Beautiful Music, 2017)

 Lounge Lizards 
 Lounge Lizards (Editions EG/Polydor, 1981)
 Live from the Drunken Boat (Europe, 1983)
 Live: 1979–1981 (ROIR, 1985)
 Big Heart: Live in Tokyo (Island, 1986)
 No Pain for Cakes (Island, 1986)
 Voice of Chunk (VeraBra, 1988)
 Live in Berlin, Volume One (VeraBra, 1992)
 Live in Berlin, Volume Two (VeraBra, 1993)
 Queen of All Ears (Strange and Beautiful Music, 1998)

 Soundtracks 
 Stranger Than Paradise and The Resurrection of Albert Ayler (Crammed Discs/Made to Measure, 1986)
 Down by Law and Variety (Crammed Discs/Made to Measure, 1987)
 Mystery Train (Milan/RCA, 1989)
 The Days with Jacques (Sony Records, 1994)
 Get Shorty (Verve, 1995)
 Excess Baggage (Prophecy, 1997)
 Fishing with John (recorded in 1991; Strange and Beautiful Music, 1998)
 African Swim and Manny & Lo (Strange and Beautiful Music, 1999)

Other appearances
 Heartbeat by Ryuichi Sakamoto (Virgin Records, 1991); saxophone on "Lulu"
 One Hot Minute by Red Hot Chili Peppers (Warner Bros., 1995); harmonica on "One Hot Minute"
 Perfect Hair by Busdriver (Big Dada, 2014); Lurie painted the album cover art
 Rain Dogs by Tom Waits (Island Records, 1985); saxophone on "Walking Spanish"
 Saints by Marc Ribot (Atlantic, 2001); includes an arrangement of Lurie's "It Could Have Been Very Beautiful"
 Spillane by John Zorn (Elektra Nonesuch, 1987); spoken vocals on "Spillane"
 Winter Was Hard'' by Kronos Quartet (Nonesuch, 1988); includes an arrangement of Lurie's "Bella by Barlight"

References

External links 
 
 

1952 births
Living people
Musicians from Minneapolis
Artists from Worcester, Massachusetts
Television producers from New York City
American jazz musicians
20th-century American painters
American male painters
21st-century American painters
21st-century American male artists
Painters from New York City
Artists from Minneapolis
Painters from Minnesota
Male actors from Worcester, Massachusetts
Musicians from Worcester, Massachusetts
Jazz musicians from New York (state)
Jazz musicians from Massachusetts
Jazz musicians from Minnesota
The Lounge Lizards members
20th-century American male artists